Grapes is a Czech comedy film about wine in South Moravia in Czech Republic directed by Tomáš Bařina. The film was released in 2008. It was followed by two sequels 2Grapes (2Bobule) in 2009 and 3Grapes (3Bobule) in 2020.

Cast
 Kryštof Hádek - Honza
 Lukáš Langmajer - Jirka
 Lubomír Lipský - Grandpa Adámek
 Tereza Voříšková - Klára
 Václav Postránecký - Michalica
 Marian Roden - František
 Miroslav Táborský - Kozderka
 Tomáš Matonoha - Kája
 Lucie Benešová - Markéta
 David Strnad - Young Honza
 Robert Jaśkow - Mácha
 Ctirad Götz -  Congressman Bouček
 Jiří Bábek - Prague policeman
 Kamil Švejda - Prague policeman 
 Martin Sitta - Jozífek

References

External links
 

2008 films
2008 comedy films
Czech comedy films
2000s Czech films